Louise Brown (born 15 October 1980) is a Danish politician. She was elected a member of parliament for the Liberal Alliance in the 2022 Danish general election.

References

See also 

 List of members of the Folketing, 2022–present

1980 births
Living people
Liberal Alliance (Denmark) politicians
21st-century Danish politicians
21st-century Danish women politicians
Members of the Folketing 2022–2026
Aalborg University alumni

Women members of the Folketing